"Closer to Love" is the first single from Mat Kearney's third album City of Black & White. It was released as a digital download on March 10, 2009. The song was featured in USA Today and chosen as the "Pick of the week." The music video was released on March 27, 2009.

Kearney explained to Relevant Magazine that this song is, "about dealing with the difficulties of a tough world, or maybe about the tough world we see our friends living in, or maybe it's something about the growing we are all a part of—longing for something whole and perfect—like we are just passing through this place."

Charts

Weekly charts

Year-end charts

Certifications

References

2009 singles
2009 songs
Columbia Records singles